Daniel Alan Spielman (born March 1970 in Philadelphia, Pennsylvania) has been a professor of applied mathematics and computer science at Yale University since 2006. As of 2018, he is the Sterling Professor of Computer Science at Yale.  He is also the Co-Director of the Yale Institute for Network Science, since its founding, and chair of the newly established Department of Statistics and Data Science.

Education
Daniel Spielman attended The Philadelphia School, and Germantown Friends School. He received his bachelor of arts degree in mathematics and computer science from Yale University in 1992 and a PhD in applied mathematics from MIT in 1995 (his dissertation was called "Computationally Efficient Error-Correcting Codes and Holographic Proofs"). He taught in the Mathematics Department at MIT from 1996 to 2005.

Awards
Spielman and his collaborator Shang-Hua Teng have jointly won the Gödel Prize twice: in 2008 for their work on smoothed analysis of algorithms and in 2015 for their work on nearly-linear-time Laplacian solvers.

In 2010 he was awarded the Nevanlinna Prize "for smoothed analysis of Linear Programming, algorithms for graph-based codes and applications of graph theory to Numerical Computing" and the same year he was named a Fellow of the Association for Computing Machinery.

In 2012 he was part of the inaugural class of Simons Investigators providing $660,000 for five years for curiosity driven research.

In October 2012, he was named a recipient of the MacArthur Fellowship.

In 2013, together with Adam Marcus and Nikhil Srivastava, he provided a positive solution to the Kadison–Singer problem, a result that was awarded the 2014 Pólya Prize.

He gave a plenary lecture at the International Congress of Mathematicians in 2010.

In 2017 he was elected to the National Academy of Sciences.

In 2022 he won the Breakthrough Prize in Mathematics "for breakthrough contributions to theoretical computer science and mathematics, including to spectral graph theory, the Kadison-Singer problem, numerical linear algebra, optimization, and coding theory.".

References

External links
 Yale faculty homepage

1970 births
Living people
Mathematicians from Philadelphia
American computer scientists
Researchers in geometric algorithms
MacArthur Fellows
Gödel Prize laureates
Nevanlinna Prize laureates
Fellows of the Association for Computing Machinery
Scientists from Pennsylvania
Massachusetts Institute of Technology School of Science faculty
Yale University faculty
Yale Sterling Professors
Massachusetts Institute of Technology School of Science alumni
Yale University alumni
Jewish American scientists
Members of the United States National Academy of Sciences
Simons Investigator
Germantown Friends School alumni
21st-century American Jews
Theoretical computer scientists